María Isabel Rábago Ríos (Ferrol, La Coruña, 2 April 1974), better known as Isabel Rabago, is a well-known Spanish gossip-magazine journalist and TV panelist who also worked as Head of Media Comm. for the Partido Popular in the Community of Madrid.

Biography 
She was from a Cantabrian family; she was born by accident in Ferrol and grew up from a very young age in El Astillero. In 1993, she was crowned Miss Cantabria, an honor she held that year in the Miss Spain contest. She began her journalistic career at the Korpa Agency, but soon after began to collaborate and present several heart and current affairs programs in various media outlets, including: TVE, Telemadrid, Telecinco or Antena 3. She has also worked for print media such as ¡Qué me dices! or El Mundo. Apart from her professional face in the media, she has also worked as a writer. She is the author of two books: "Las ltimas cortesanas" and "La Pantoja, Julián & CIA: asalto a Marbella".

In 2015, she participated in Supervivientes, being the third expelled after 28 days on the island. Since then, she has worked in various Mediaset España programs such as Ya es mediodía, Viva la vida or La casa fuerte.

In 2018, she joined politics as head of communication and media in the Partido Popular of Madrid, forming part of the Deputy Secretary of Communication led by Isabel Díaz Ayuso and being in charge of carrying out the relationship with the media. In the position, she remained until October 2019. In September 2021, she signed on as a contestant on Secret Story: La casa de los secretos.

Television career

Published books

References

External links 
 Isabel Rábago on Instagram

1974 births
Living people
Pontifical University of Salamanca alumni
Spanish television journalists
People's Party (Spain) politicians
Politicians from Cantabria
Writers from Cantabria
Spanish television personalities